The 1901 VFL season was the fifth season of the Victorian Football League (VFL), the highest level senior Australian rules football competition in Victoria. The season featured eight clubs, ran from 4 May until 7 September, and comprised a 17-game home-and-away season followed by a finals series featuring the top four clubs.

The premiership was won by the Essendon Football Club for the second time, after it defeated  by 27 points in the 1901 VFL Grand Final.

Premiership season
In 1901, the VFL competition consisted of eight teams of 18 on-the-field players each, with no "reserves", although any of the 18 players who had left the playing field for any reason could later resume their place on the field at any time during the match.

Each team played each other twice in a home-and-away season of 14 rounds. Then, based on ladder positions after those 14 rounds, three further 'sectional rounds' were played, with the teams ranked 1st, 3rd, 5th and 7th playing in one section and the teams ranked 2nd, 4th, 6th and 8th playing in the other. 

Once the 17 rounds of the home-and-away season had finished, the 1901 VFL Premiers were determined by the specific format and conventions of the original Argus system.

Round 1

Round 2

Round 3

Round 4

Round 5

Round 6

Round 7

Round 8

Round 9

Round 10

Round 11

Round 12

Round 13

Round 14

Sectional Rounds

Sectional Round 1 (Round 15)

Sectional Round 2 (Round 16)

Sectional Round 3 (Round 17)

Ladder

Semi finals

1st Semi Final

2nd Semi Final

Grand final

Awards
 The 1901 VFL  Premiership team was Essendon.
 The VFL's leading goalkicker was Fred Hiskins of Essendon with 34 goals.
 St. Kilda took the "wooden spoon" in 1901.

Notable events
 Fitzroy lodged an official protest against the result of the Second Semi-Final, which it lost against Essendon by one point, alleging that the goal umpire had erred in awarding Essendon's first goal because the ball had hit the post. Later in the week, Fitzroy withdrew its protest against the result, and the scheduling of the Final was not affected; an inquiry later in September found that the goal umpire had made a mistake, but no change was made to the score after the finding.
 Against South Melbourne in Round 6, Essendon kicked 17 behinds between its first and second goals. Only Geelong against St. Kilda in 1919 and St. Kilda against Fitzroy in 1921 have beaten this unwanted record. Fred Hiskins kicked ten behinds.
 In the last home-and-away match between South Melbourne and  Geelong, field umpire Henry "Ivo" Crapp experiments with clearly calling out his decisions. 
 In Essendon's "Grand Final" victory against Collingwood, Albert Thurgood kicks three of Essendon's six goals. One of his goals was scored with an 86-yard (79 m.) drop-kick, and another (measured immediately after the match) was scored with a 93-yard (85 m.) place-kick into a strong head wind.
 VFL instituted the original Argus system to determine the season's premiers.

References

 Maplestone, M., Flying Higher: History of the Essendon Football Club 1872–1996, Essendon Football Club, (Melbourne), 1996. 
 Rogers, S. & Brown, A., Every Game Ever Played: VFL/AFL Results 1897–1997 (Sixth Edition), Viking Books, (Ringwood), 1998. 
 Ross, J. (ed), 100 Years of Australian Football 1897–1996: The Complete Story of the AFL, All the Big Stories, All the Great Pictures, All the Champions, Every AFL Season Reported, Viking, (Ringwood), 1996.

External links
 1901 Season - AFL Tables

Australian Football League seasons
VFL season